Lysathia ludoviciana, the water-primrose flea beetle, is a species of flea beetle in the family Chrysomelidae. It is found in the Caribbean Sea, Central America, and North America.

References

Further reading

 
 

Alticini
Articles created by Qbugbot
Beetles described in 1910